Sporobolus clandestinus, common names rough dropseed and rough rushgrass, is a species of grass found in North America.  It is listed as endangered in Connecticut., Maryland, New York (state), and Pennsylvania. It is listed as threatened in Kentucky.

References

Flora of North America
clandestinus